Tracey Lee McLellan (born 20 May 1970) is a New Zealand politician. In 2020 she was elected as a Member of Parliament in the House of Representatives for the Labour Party.

Early life
McLellan was born in Sydney Australia in May 1970, before moving to Southland, where she grew up in a state house. Her mother was disabled and unable to work. McLellan moved to Christchurch in 2002. McLellan has a PhD in Psychology from the University of Canterbury and worked in academic psychology specializing in sports injuries and concussion, as a research scientist at the University of Canterbury. Later she became a union organiser for the New Zealand Nurses Organisation.

Political career

McLellan has been a member of the Labour Party since 2011. In May 2019 she won a by-election to become vice president of the Labour Party. Following Nigel Haworth's resignation over his handling of abuse allegations within the party, McLellan (who was a member of a panel which dismissed initial complaints) became acting party president.

She was selected as its candidate for the Banks Peninsula electorate in November 2019, ahead of three other nominees: Reuben Davidson, Joe Davies and Tyrone Fields. In January 2020, McLellan identified ACC and health as portfolios in which she would like to make a difference, but says that her electorate has diverse needs from climate change effects in Sumner and Lyttelton, to education, health, housing and water issues.

During the 2020 general election held on 17 October, McLellan was elected with a majority of 13,156 over National's Catherine Chu and Green Party Member of Parliament Eugenie Sage.

Family 
McLellan is a single mother to two sons. One son, Jake, was elected a member of the Christchurch City Council in 2019. She credits her son with pushing her to join the Labour Party.

References

|-

|-

1970 births
Living people
New Zealand Labour Party MPs
New Zealand MPs for Christchurch electorates
Members of the New Zealand House of Representatives
21st-century New Zealand politicians
21st-century New Zealand women politicians
Women members of the New Zealand House of Representatives